Heraclius II, also known as Erekle II and The Little Kakhetian (7 November 1720 or 7 October 1721 [according to C. Toumanoff] – 11 January 1798), was a Georgian monarch of the Bagrationi dynasty, reigning as the king of Kakheti from 1744 to 1762, and of Kartli and Kakheti from 1762 until 1798. In the contemporary Persian sources he is referred to as Erekli Khan, while Russians knew him as Irakly. His name is frequently transliterated in a Latinized form Heraclius because both names Erekle and Irakli are Georgian versions of this Greek name.

From being granted the kingship of Kakheti by his overlord Nader Shah in 1744 as a reward for his loyalty, to becoming the penultimate king of the united kingdoms of Kakheti and Kartli in eastern Georgia, his reign is regarded as the swan song of the Georgian monarchy. Aided by his personal abilities and the unrest in the Persian Empire, Heraclius established himself as a de facto autonomous ruler, unified eastern Georgia politically for the first time in three centuries,  and attempted to modernize the government, economics, and military. Overwhelmed by the internal and external menaces to Georgia's precarious independence and its temporary hegemony in eastern Transcaucasia, he placed his kingdom under the formal Russian protection in 1783, but the move did not prevent Georgia from being devastated by the Persian invasion in 1795. Heraclius died in 1798, leaving the throne to his moribund heir, George XII.

Early years

Service under Nader Shah 
Born in Telavi, the center of Kakheti region of Georgia, Heraclius was a son of Teimuraz II of Kakheti and his wife Tamar, daughter of Vakhtang VI of Kartli. His childhood and early teens coincided with the occupation of Kakheti by the Ottomans from 1732 until 1735, when they were ousted from Georgia by Nader Shah of Iran, in his two successive campaigns of 1734 and 1735, by which the latter quickly reestablished Persian rule over Georgia. Teimuraz sided with the Persians and was installed as a Persian vali (governor) in Kakheti, while Kilij Ali-Khan (Khanjal) was made that of neighboring Kartli. However, many Georgian nobles refused to accept the new regime and rose in rebellion in response to heavy tribute levied by Nader upon the Georgian provinces. Nonetheless, Teimuraz and Heraclius remained loyal to the shah, partly in order to prevent the comeback of the rival Mukhrani branch, whose fall early in the 1720s had opened the way to Teimuraz's accession in Kartli. From 1737 to 1739, Heraclius commanded a Georgian auxiliary force during Nader's expedition in India and gained a reputation of an able military commander. He then served as a lieutenant to his father and assumed the regency when Teimuraz was briefly summoned for consultations in the Persian capital of Isfahan in 1744. In the meantime, Heraclius defeated a coup attempt by the rival Georgian prince Abdullah Beg of the Mukhrani dynasty and helped Teimuraz suppress the aristocratic opposition to the Persian hegemony led by Givi Amilakhvari. As a reward, Nader granted the kingship of Kartli to Teimuraz and of Kakheti to Heraclius in 1744, and also arranged the marriage of his nephew Ali-Qoli Khan, who eventually would succeed him as Adil Shah, to Teimuraz's daughter Kethevan.

Nader's death and reign in Kakheti
Yet, both Georgian kingdoms remained under heavy Persian tribute until Nader was assassinated in 1747. Teimuraz and Heraclius took advantage of the ensuing political instability in Persia to assert their independence and expelled Persian garrisons from all key positions in Georgia, including Tbilisi. In close cooperation with each other, they managed to prevent a new revolt by the Mukhranian supporters fomented by Ebrahim Khan, brother of Adel Shah, in 1748. They concluded an anti-Persian alliance with the khans of Azerbaijan who were particularly vulnerable to the aggression from Persian warlords and agreed to recognize Heraclius's supremacy in eastern Transcaucasia. In 1749, he occupied Yerevan, and in June 1751, Heraclius defeated a large army commanded by a pretender to the Persian throne and his former ally, Azat-Khan in the Battle of Kirkhbulakh. After these particular events, Heraclius could largely afford to ignore the changing situation to the south of the Aras River. In 1752, the Georgian kings sent a mission to Russia to request 3,000 Russian troops or a subsidy to enable them to hire Circassian mercenaries in order to invade Persia and install a pro-Russian government there. The embassy failed to yield any results, however, for the Russian court was preoccupied with European affairs.

King of Kartli and Kakheti 

Around the same time, it had become apparent that Mashhad, a minor Afsharid remnant, was no longer functioning as the seat of the Iranian government. In 1762, Teimuraz II died while on a diplomatic mission to the court of St. Petersburg, and Heraclius succeeded him as King of Kartli, thus uniting eastern Georgia politically for the first time in three centuries. In 1762-1763, during Karim Khan Zand's campaigns in Azerbaijan, Erekle II tendered his de jure submission to him and received his investiture as vali ("governor", "viceroy") of Gorjestan (Georgia), the traditional Safavid office, which by this time however had become an "empty honorific".

Alliance with Russia 
In foreign policy, Heraclius was primarily focused on seeking a reliable protector that would guarantee Georgia's survival. He chose Russia not only because it was Orthodox Christian, but in Lang's account also because it would serve as a link to Europe, which he thought a model for Georgia's development as a modern nation. Yet, Heraclius's initial cooperation with Russia proved disappointing. His participation in the Russo-Turkish War (1768–1774) did not lead to an anticipated reconquest of the Ottoman-held southern Georgian lands, for the Russian commanders in Georgia behaved in a highly condescending, often treacherous way, and  Empress Catherine II treated the Caucasus front as merely a secondary theater of military operations. Still, Heraclius continued to seek firmer alliance with Russia, his immediate motivation being the Persian ruler Karim Khan's attempts to bring Georgia back into the Persian sphere of influence. Karim Khan's death in 1779 temporarily relieved Heraclius of these dangers, as Persia again became engulfed in chaos.

In 1783, the Russian expansion southward into the Crimea brought the Caucasus into Catherine II's area of interest. In the Treaty of Georgievsk of 1783, Heraclius finally obtained the guarantees he had sought from Russia, transforming Georgia into a Russian protectorate, as Heraclius formally repudiated all legal ties to Persia and placed his foreign policy under the Russian supervision. However, during the Russo-Turkish War (1787–1792), a Tbilisi-based small Russian force evacuated Georgia, leaving Heraclius to face new dangers from Persia alone. In 1790 Heraclius concluded the Treaty of the Iberians with western Georgian polities.

Qajar invasion 
Mohammad Khan Qajar, who had managed to bring most of central Iranian plateau under his firm control by 1794, was inclined to revive the Persian Empire with the Caucasus again as its part. In 1795, after a swift reconquest of much of southeastern Caucasus, he demanded that Heraclius reacknowledged Persian suzerainty, promising in return to confirm him as vali. Heraclius refused, and in September 1795, the Persian army of 35,000 moved into Georgia. After the valiant defense of Tbilisi at the Battle of Krtsanisi, in which the king participated personally in the advance guard, Heraclius's small army of 5000 men was almost completely annihilated and Tbilisi completely sacked. While becoming a witness of the fearful devastation of his capital and slaughter of its civilians, king Heraclius, who did not want to leave the battlefield and the city was spirited away by the last of his bodyguards and a few family members. The Persian invasion delivered a hard blow to Georgia from which it was not able to recover. Despite being abandoned at the critical moment, he still had to rely on belated Russian support and fought, in 1796, alongside the Russian expeditionary forces sent by Catherine into the Persian territories. But her death that year brought an abrupt change of policy in the Caucasus, and her successor Paul I again withdrew all Russian troops from the region. Agha Mohammad launched his second campaign to punish the Georgians for their alliance with Russia. However, his assassination in 1797 spared Kartli-Kakheti more devastation.

Coinage 
Erekle II's "curiously ambivalent position" in these decades is reflected in the coins issued by him in his realm. Silver coins were struck with the name of Ismail III on it, or with the Zand-style inscription ya karim ("O Gracious One"), whereby an epithet to God was invoked, which actually referred to Karim Khan Zand. These coins were minted in Tbilisi up until 1799 – some twenty years after Karim Khan Zand's death. In the same decades, the copper coins struck at Tbilisi bore three types of iconography; Christian, Georgian, "and even" Imperial Russian (such as the double-headed eagle). By minting the silver coins with a reference to Karim Khan Zand on it they were usable for trade in Iran, whereas the copper coins, struck for only local use, reflected Erekle II's political orientation towards Russia.

Court, efforts and final years 
While maintaining certain Persian-type pomp at his court, he launched an ambitious program of "Europeanization" which was supported by the Georgian intellectual élites, but was not overwhelmingly successful because Georgia remained physically isolated from Europe and had to expend all available resources on defending its precarious independence. He strove to enlist the support of European powers and to attract Western scientists and technicians to give his country the benefit of the latest military and industrial techniques. His style of governing resembled that of contemporary enlightened despots in Central Europe. He exercised executive, legislative, and judicial authority and closely supervised the activities of government departments. Heraclius's primary objective in internal policy was to further centralize the government through reducing the powers of the aristocracy. For this purpose, he attempted to create a governing élite composed of his own agents to replace the self-minded aristocratic lords in local affairs. At the same time, he encouraged peasant-vassals to supply the military force necessary to overcome the aristocracy's resistance and protect the country from incessant marauding assaults from Dagestan known to Georgians as Lekianoba. In the words of the British historian David Marshall Lang, "his vigilance in the care of his people knew no bounds. On campaign, he would sit up at night watching for the enemy, while in time of peace, he spent his life in transacting business of state or in religious exercise, and devoted but a few hours to sleep." 

Heraclius died in 1798 still convinced that only Russian protection could ensure the continued existence of his country. He was succeeded by his weak and sickly son, George XII, after whose death Tsar Paul I annexed, in 1801, Kartli-Kakheti to Russia, terminating both Georgia's independence and a millennium-long rule of the Bagrationi Dynasty.

Family 

Heraclius II was married three times; first, he married Princess Ketevan née Orbeliani in 1738 or Princess Ketevan née Mkheidze in 1740. According to a relatively recently established version, Princess Orbeliani was repudiated by Heraclius before the marriage actually took place. Instead, he married Princess Mkheidze, who died in 1744. Of his first marriage, Heraclius two children:

Vakhtang (b. 1742 – d. Tbilisi, 1 February 1756), Duke of Aragvi (1747); married Princess Kethevan of Mukhrani, no issue.
Rusadan (b. before 1744; died young)

In 1745 Heraclius remarried Princess Anna née Abashidze (b. 1730 – d. Tbilisi, 7 December 1749). They had two children:
George (b. 10 October 1746 – d. Tbilisi, 28 December 1800), the last King of Georgia.
Thamar (b. 11 July 1749 – d. Tbilisi, 4 August 1786), married in 1762 Prince David Orbeliani.

In 1750, Heraclius married thirdly Darejan née Dadiani (Daria; b. 20 July 1734 – d. 8 November 1808). They had 23 children:

Solomon (died 1765)
Helene (1753–1786), married 1stly 1770, Prince Archil of Imereti; 2ndly 1785 Prince Zakaria Andronikashvili 
Mariam (1755–1828), married 1777 Davit Tsitsishvili, Prince of Zemo-Satsitsiano
Sophia (c. 1756; died young)
Levan (1756–1781)
Iulon (1760–1816)
Vakhtang (Almaskhan) (1761–1814)
Salome (c. 1761; died young)
Teimuraz (1763—1827)
Anastasia (b. Martkopi, 3 November 1763 – d. St. Petersburg, 17 January 1838), married 1797 Prince Revaz Eristavi of Ksani 
Keteven (1764 – 5 July 1840), married 1stly 1781, Ioane, Prince of Mukhrani (1755–1801), with living descendants; 2ndly Prince Abel Andronikashvili (disputed)
Mirian (1767–1834)
Soslan-David (died c. 1767)
Alexander (1770–1844) who headed several insurrections against the Russian rule in Georgia between 1800 and 1832.
Archil (died c. 1771)
Luarsab (born 1772; died young)
Ekaterina (1774–1818), married in 1793 Prince Giorgi Irubakidzé-Cholokashvili.
Thecla (1776 – 11 March 1846), married in 1800 Prince Vakhtang Jambakurian-Orbeliani.
Parnaoz (1777–1852)

Legacy

King Heraclius occupies a special place among the Georgian monarchs, with his name being associated with chivalry and valour among Georgians. However, the recent dispute has been over Erekle's decision to sign Treaty of Georgievsk with Russia. It has been reported that those with different views on how to manage relations with Russia accordingly have different interpretations of Erekle's move. For example, the "Society of Erekle II", established in 2009, seeks closer ties with Russia as opposed to the integration with the West. They primarily justify their position through alluding to Erekle's decision and claim that the Orthodox kinship with Russia was of paramount importance to preserve Georgian nationhood, while the European culture may pose threat to Georgian spirituality, especially Orthodox Christianity as a pillar of Georgianness. Others who hold more pro-Western views emphasize that King Erekle saw Russia as a window to European civilization. 

Erekleoba is an annual, traditional public feast celebrated at the King Erekle II's palace in Eastern Georgia's city of Telavi on November 7 to pay tribute to his memory.

See also 
List of people with the most children
Society of Irakli II

References

Sources 
 
 
 
 
 

1720 births
1798 deaths
18th-century people from Georgia (country)
Bagrationi dynasty of the Kingdom of Kartli-Kakheti
Eastern Orthodox monarchs
People from Telavi
Afsharid generals
Battle of Krtsanisi
Burials at Svetitskhoveli Cathedral
People of the Russo-Turkish War (1768–1774)
Afsharid governors of Kakheti
Kings of Kakheti